Quşəncə (also, Quşencə, Kushendzha, Kushendzhe, and Kush-Yengidzha) is a village and municipality in the Ismailli Rayon of Azerbaijan.  It has a population of 2,525.  The municipality consists of the villages of Quşəncə, Balik, and Enişdibi.

References 

Populated places in Ismayilli District